Reencuentro may refer to:
 Reencuentro (José José album)
 Reencuentro (Álvaro Torres album)
 Reencuentro (song)

See also
 Reencuentros, a 1994 album by Yuri